HM Prison Thameside is a Category B men's private prison in the Thamesmead area of the Royal Borough of Greenwich, south-east London, England. Thameside Prison is operated by Serco and is situated next to Belmarsh and Isis prisons.

History
The prison was designed and constructed by Serco and opened on 30 March 2012, becoming fully operational in Autumn 2012, with a capacity of 900. It holds prisoners from courts previously served by Brixton Prison and other prisons in London.

In January 2013, the Ministry of Justice announced that an additional houseblock would be constructed at Thameside Prison, increasing its capacity.

In May 2013, a report by the Chief Inspector of Prisons was critical of the levels of violence at the prison and its restricted regime. The report found that there was a high level of assaults and use of force, while 60% of prisoners were locked up during the working day, and some inmates spent 23 hours a day in their cells. However, the report also praised the quality of accommodation throughout the prison.

The prison today
The regime at Thameside Prison combines work, education, vocational training, accredited offending behaviour programmes, and prisoner health and appropriate interventions. It is a Local category B establishment that can currently hold 1232 convicted and remand male prisoners.

The prison has a baseline Certificate of Normal Accommodation of 932, and an in-use Operational Capacity of 1232.

References

External links
Serco pages on Thameside
Inside Time information on HMP Thameside

Prisons in London
Buildings and structures in the Royal Borough of Greenwich
Category B prisons in England
2012 establishments in England
2012 in London
Private prisons in the United Kingdom
Serco